Thomas Helliker (sometimes spelled Hilliker) (23 March 1784 – 22 March 1803), known as the Trowbridge Martyr, was a figure in early English trade union history who was hanged, aged 19, for his alleged role in machine-breaking at a Wiltshire woollen mill. His conviction has been challenged as controversial and faulty, and he is now regarded as a victim of anti-Luddite sentiment.

Arrest and trial
Helliker had been employed as a shearman's colt at a woollen mill owned by a Mr Naish at Semington, near Trowbridge in Wiltshire. As such he was close to the most highly skilled workers who stood to lose most from mechanisation and therefore were well-organised in resisting it. 

The workers had organised an anti-machinery mill-burning riot that destroyed the mill on 22 July 1802 and Helliker was accused of waving a pistol at a night-watchman during this attack. Heath, the tenant of the mill, witnessed this attack and gave a description similar to Helliker's to a police officer, Read; furthermore, Helliker had been heard praising the attacks on the machines. He was arrested in Trowbridge on 3 August 1802. Heath later picked him out in an identification parade although Helliker was the only mill employee in the line-up and already known to him. He was taken before the magistrates and denied the offence, however the magistrate, Mr Jones told him  Despite Helliker having an alibi from his friend Joseph Warren, to the effect that they had both got drunk on the night in question and had locked themselves inside a house until the morning, he was charged and lodged in Salisbury gaol.

Thomas Helliker was tried in Salisbury despite the fact that many people at the time believed his statements that he was innocent, and tried to get him to name the actual culprit. He refused to do so; Warren failed to attend the court to support the alibi, having been taken to Yorkshire by colleagues who had felt that he would not withstand questioning. The only evidence against Helliker was that of Heath's identification, although he had also been given £500, a very large sum at that time, as a reward. Helliker's counsel, a Mr Garrow, failed to undermine Heath's identification, and a newspaper report of the time said 

Helliker was hanged on his 19th birthday; his colleagues claimed his body and carried it across Salisbury Plain back to Trowbridge. On 22 March 2003, the anniversary of his hanging was marked by a ceremony by the side of his tomb, and it was then said that

Final letter
A handwritten copy of the last letter written by Helliker (signed Hiliker) is on display at Trowbridge Museum. In 2010 it was selected as one of 100 objects in the BBC's A History of the World project, in partnership with the British Museum and 350 museums and institutions across the country.

Tomb

Helliker's tomb is in the churchyard of St James's Church, Trowbridge, a short distance from the town centre.

A second inscription was added later:

Notes and references

English trade unionists
1784 births
1803 deaths